The 1978 Buffalo Bulls football team represented the University at Buffalo as an  independent during the 1978 NCAA Division III football season. Led by Bill Dando in his second season as head coach, the team compiled a record of 3–6.

Schedule

References

Buffalo
Buffalo Bulls football seasons
Buffalo Bulls football